Kind Words may refer to:
 Kind Words (video game), 2019 video game
 Kind Words (And a Real Good Heart), 1986 song by Joan Armatrading
 KindWords, word processor
 The Kind Words, 2015 film